Peeter Kurvits (7 November 1891 – 12 February 1962 Tallinn) was an Estonian politician.

In 1933 he was Minister of Economic Affairs.

References

1891 births
1962 deaths
Finance ministers of Estonia